The Hundred of Belalie is a  cadastral unit of hundred located in the Mid North of South Australia in the approach to the lower Flinders Ranges. It is one of the hundreds of the County of Victoria and its main town is Jamestown, South Australia.
The Hundred corresponded to the former District Council of Belalie. 
The rural localities of Belalie North and Belalie East derive from the hundred.

See also 
Belalie Creek
District Council of Belalie
Belalie East, South Australia
Belalie (insect)

References

Belalie
1870 establishments in Australia